La Sauvetat-de-Savères is a commune in the Lot-et-Garonne department in south-western France.

History 
La Sauvetat-de-Savères was, in the 12th century, a bastide built up around a Benedictine priory. From the jurisdiction of Puymirol in the 13th century, La-Sauvetat-de-Savères became chief town of the bailiwick of the same name in the 14th. A garrison was placed there, in 1587, for keeping watch Puymirol. On August 16, 1589, Villars attacked four companies of Laugnac and Belzunce who had taken refuge there, and exerted reprisals on the city.

See also
Communes of the Lot-et-Garonne department

References

Sauvetatdesaveres